The Dubbo Regional Council is a local government area located in the Central West and Orana regions of New South Wales, Australia. The council was formed on 12 May 2016 through a merger of the City of Dubbo and Wellington Council as part of a widespread council amalgamation program. It was initially named Western Plains Regional Council for almost four months, and its name was changed to Dubbo Regional Council on 7 September 2016.

The current Mayor of Dubbo Regional Council is Councillor Mathew Dickerson.

Towns and localities
As well as the regional centre of Dubbo, the following towns and localities are located within Dubbo Regional Council:

Heritage listings
Dubbo Regional Council area has a number of heritage-listed sites, including:

Dubbo
 Cobra Street: Dubbo RAAF Stores Depot
 Macquarie Street: Talbragar Shire Council Chambers
 110-114 Macquarie Street: National Australia Bank building, Dubbo
 118 Macquarie Street: Colonial Mutual Life building, Dubbo
 195-197 Macquarie Street: Milestone Hotel
 215 Macquarie Street: Old Dubbo Gaol
 Main Western railway: Dubbo railway station 
 Main Western railway: Dubbo rail bridge over Macquarie River
 Obley Road: Dundullimal Homestead
Euchareena
 2531 Euchareena Road: Nubrygyn Inn and Cemetery
Stuart Town
 Main Western railway: Stuart Town railway station
Wellington
 9 Amaroo Drive: John Fowler 7nhp Steam Road Locomotive
 Curtis Street: Wellington Convict and Mission Site
 21 Maughan Street: Wellington Post Office
 University Road: Blacks Camp

Demographics

The population for the predecessor councils was estimated in 2015 as:
 in City of Dubbo
 in Wellington Council

Council

Current composition and election method
The Dubbo Regional Council is composed of ten Councillors elected proportionally. The Council is divided into five wards, each electing two councillors. All Councillors are elected for a fixed four-year term of office. The Mayor is elected by the Councillors at the first meeting of the Council. The current makeup of the council is as follows:

The most recent election was held on 25 October 2021 and the makeup of the Council is as follows:

See also

 Local government areas of New South Wales

References

 

 
Local government areas of New South Wales
2016 establishments in Australia
Populated places established in 2016